Silvia Eiblmayr (born in Berchtesgaden) is an Austrian art historian and curator.

Life and work 
Eiblmayr was born in Germany and grew up in Upper Austria and lives and works in Vienna. She holds a doctorate in art history from the University of Vienna and works as a curator in the field of contemporary art.

From 1988 onwards, Eiblmayr held several teaching posts and visiting professorships in Austria, Germany, Switzerland and England. From 1988 to 2003, she taught at the University of Vienna. In 2009, Eiblmayr was, together with Valie Export Commissioner of the Austrian Pavilion at the 53rd Venice Biennale.

In 2019, she received the Österreichischer Staatspreis für Kunstkritik.

Further reading 
 Silvia Eiblmayr (edit.): Kunst mit Eigen-Sinn. Aktuelle Kunst von Frauen. Texte und Dokumentation. Loecker, Vienna [among others] 1985, 
 Silvia Eiblmayr: Die Frau als Bild. Der weibliche Körper in der Kunst des 20. Jahrhunderts. Reimer, Berlin 1993, 
 Adam Szymczyk, Erik van der Heeg, Silvia Eiblmayr und Rainer Iglar: Zuzanna Janin. Salzburger Kunstverein, Salzburg 1995, 
 Silvia Eiblmayr (edit.): Die verletzte Diva. Hysterie, Körper, Technik in der Kunst des 20. Jahrhunderts. Oktagon, Cologne 2000, 
 Atsuko Tanaka and Silvia Eiblmayr: Atsuko Tanaka. Hatje Cantz, Ostfildern-Ruit 2002, 
 Brigitte Reinhardt and Silvia Eiblmayr (edit.): Carol Rama, Appassionata. Hatje Cantz, Ostfildern-Ruit 2004, 
 Silvia Eiblmayr, Astrid Wege, Eva Schmidt and Gerald Schröder: Charlotte Posenenske. Revolver, Archiv für Aktuelle Kunst, Frankfurt, 2005, 
 Silvia Eiblmayr (edit.): Carola Dertnig: Nachbilder einer ungleichzeitigen Gegenwart. Afterimages of a Non-simultaneous Present. Skarabaeus, Innsbruck 2006, 
 Florian Matzner, Institut für moderne Kunst Nürnberg, Stephan Berg, Martin Hochleitner, Silvia Eiblmayr, Thomas Elsen, Peter Lenhart, Heinz Schütz: Haubitz + Zoche. Fliegende Bauten. Verlag für Moderne Kunst, Nürnberg 2009, 
 Günther Holler-Schuster, Peter Pakesch, Gottfried Boehm and Silvia Eiblmayr: Maria Lassnig. Der Ort der Bilder / The Location of Pictures. König, Cologne 2013,

References

External links 
 

Austrian art historians
Women art historians
Austrian art curators
Gender studies academics
Academic staff of the University of Vienna
University of Vienna alumni
Date of birth missing (living people)
Living people
People from Berchtesgaden
Year of birth missing (living people)
Austrian women curators